First Baptist Church of Denver is an historic church at 230 E. 14th Avenue-1373 Grant Street in Denver, Colorado. First Baptist Church of Denver ("FBCD") was formally organized in 1864, six years after the city's founding. 

After serving its community in several places in Denver's downtown, its congregation's current building is located at the intersection of 14th Avenue and Grant Street, directly across from the south steps of the Colorado State Capitol. The church was designed by well-known and prolific Denver architect, G. Meredith Musick, who designed the church in the Georgian architectural style. Among other works, Musick was a co-designer of the U.S. Customshouse in Denver.  The construction of the church took place between 1935 and 1938.

It sports giant columns in its portico, built from granite quarried in Lyons, Colorado. They were turned and hand-polished on a lathe on site. Upon completion, they were the largest polished granite columns in Colorado.

It was listed on the National Register of Historic Places in 1974 as a contributing building within the Civic Center Historic District, and it was further individually added again to the National Register in 2005.

The church's mission is to be "a center of activity for Capitol Hill where people of all walks of life and systems of belief can experience conversations rooted in hope and filled with a passion to serve the needs of the broader community".

Reflective of FBCD's historic involvement in social justice, the Reverend Doctor Martin Luther King, Jr. preached from FBCD's pulpit on April 16, 1962.

References

External links
First Baptist Church of Denver website

Baptist churches in Colorado
Churches on the National Register of Historic Places in Colorado
Colonial Revival architecture in Colorado
Churches completed in 1938
National Register of Historic Places in Denver
Civic Center Historic District (Denver, Colorado)
Historic district contributing properties in Colorado